Elphidium williamsoni is a species of foraminiferans belonging to the family Elphidiidae. Elphidium williamsoni is found in abundance around the coasts of the UK, predominantly in the lower end of the coast.

See also
 List of prehistoric foraminiferans

References

Further reading 
 
 
 

Rotaliida
Animals described in 1973